Louisiana Highway 1 Business may refer to:

Louisiana Highway 1 Business (Natchitoches) (LA 1 Business) in Natchitoches
Louisiana Highway 1 Business (New Roads) (LA 1 Business) in New Roads